Ginny & Georgia is an American comedy-drama television series created by Sarah Lampert that was released on Netflix on February 24, 2021. In April 2021, the series was renewed for a second season, which premiered on January 5, 2023.

Premise
Ginny & Georgia follows fifteen-year-old Ginny Miller and her thirty-year-old mother Georgia, who, along with Ginny's younger brother Austin, move to the fictional Massachusetts town of Wellsbury for a fresh start, after Georgia's husband dies.

Cast and characters

Main
 Brianne Howey as Georgia Miller, single mother of Ginny and Austin
 Nikki Roumel as teenage Georgia Miller
 Antonia Gentry as Virginia "Ginny" Miller, Georgia's 15-year-old daughter, who feels more mature than her dynamic mother
 Diesel La Torraca as Austin Miller, Georgia's 9-year-old son and Ginny's brother who shares an avid interest in Harry Potter
 Jennifer Robertson as Ellen Baker, the Millers' neighbor who is the mother of Marcus and Max and befriends Georgia
 Felix Mallard as Marcus Baker, Ellen's teenage son, Max's fraternal twin brother, and Ginny's love interest
 Sara Waisglass as Maxine "Max" Baker, Ellen's openly lesbian teenage daughter, Marcus' fraternal twin sister, and Ginny's new best friend, who has narcissistic tendencies
 Scott Porter as Mayor Paul Randolph, the mayor of Wellsbury, Massachusetts who is up for reelection; the town's most eligible bachelor, he becomes Georgia's love interest and eventual husband
 Raymond Ablack as Joe, the owner of a local farm-to-table restaurant called Blue Farm Café who briefly knew Georgia as a teenager
 Katie Douglas as Abby (season 2, recurring season 1), a friend of Max and Ginny and part of the MANG (Max-Abby-Norah-Ginny) group who is insecure about herself and struggling greatly with her parents' divorce
 Chelsea Clark as Norah (season 2, recurring season 1), a friend of Max and Ginny and part of the MANG group

Recurring

 Mason Temple as Hunter Chen, a band member who becomes one of Ginny's love interests
 Jonathan Potts as Mr. Gitten, Ginny and Max's AP English teacher who has a strained relationship with Ginny who opposes his teaching
 Sabrina Grdevich as Cynthia Fuller, Zach's mother and real-estate agent who is running for mayor against Paul
 Alisen Down as Bev
 Colton Gobbo as Jordan, Norah's boyfriend, a friend of MANG 
 Connor Laidman as Zach, Austin's school bully and Cynthia's son
 Devyn Nekoda as Riley (season 1), one of Max's love interests
 Karen LeBlanc as Lynette Miller
 Nathan Mitchell as Zion Miller, Georgia's ex-boyfriend and Ginny's biological father
 Kyle Bary as teenage Zion Miller
 Rebecca Ablack as Padma, Marcus' pseudo-girlfriend
 Tyssen Smith as Brodie, a friend of MANG 
 Daniel Beirne as Nick, Paul's campaign manager at the office and friend of Georgia
 Humberly González as Sophie Sanchez, a senior at school and Max's love interest
 Alex Mallari Jr. as PI Gabriel Cordova, Nick's new trusting boyfriend who is investigating Georgia
 Damian Romeo as Matt Press, a friend of MANG
 Chris Kenopic as Clint Baker, Ellen's husband and Marcus and Max's father, who is deaf
 Romi Shraiter as Samantha, a fellow student rejected by the MANG group
 Tameka Griffiths as Bracia, a fellow student who Ginny befriends
 Zarrin Darnell-Martin as Dr. Lily (season 2), Ginny's therapist
 Agape Mngomezulu as Bryon Bennett (season 2), Bracia's love interest
 Katelyn Wells as Silver (season 2), Maxine’s new love interest
 Aaron Ashmore as Gil Timmins (season 2), one of Georgia's ex-boyfriends and Austin's father
 Vinessa Antoine as Simone (season 2), Zion's love interest

Episodes

Series overview

Season 1 (2021)

Season 2 (2023)

Production

Development
On August 13, 2019, it was announced that Netflix had given the production a series order for a first season consisting of ten episodes. The series comes from creator Sarah Lampert and showrunner Debra J. Fisher. Other executive producers include Anya Adams, Jeff Tahler, Jenny Daly, Holly Hines, and Dan March. Adams also directed the first two episodes of the series. Lampert penned the script while working at Madica Productions as the manager of development. The script was then sent to Critical Content and shared with Dynamic Television before touching down at Netflix. On April 19, 2021, Netflix renewed the series for a second season.

Casting
Alongside the initial series announcement, it was reported that Brianne Howey, Antonia Gentry, Diesel La Torraca, Jennifer Robertson, Felix Mallard, Sara Waisglass, Scott Porter, and Raymond Ablack were cast as series regulars. On January 20, 2021, it was announced that Mason Temple was cast in a recurring role. In order to prepare for their roles, Robertson, Mallard and Waisglass learned American Sign Language. On January 28, 2022, it was reported that Aaron Ashmore was joining the cast in a recurring role for the second season.

Filming
Principal photography for the series began on August 14, 2019, and ended on December 10, 2019. Filming took place in Toronto and Cobourg, Ontario, Canada. Filming for the second season began on November 29, 2021, and concluded on April 23, 2022.

Release
Ginny & Georgia premiered on February 24, 2021. The second season was released on January 5, 2023.

Reception

Audience viewership
On April 19, 2021, Netflix announced that 52 million subscribers watched the first season of the series for the first 28 days after its release. In its first 28-days on Netflix, Ginny & Georgia was watched for 381M hours globally.

On January 10, 2023, it was reported that the second season was at the top of Netflix Top 10 TV Chart for the week of January 2 to January 8, 2023, with 180.47M hours viewed. For the week of January 9 to January 15, the second season was at the top of Netflix Top 10 TV Chart again with 162.7M hours viewed for the week. Season 2 now resides in the all-time top 10 English language shows with 504.77 million hours watched globally in the first 28 days.

Critical response

For the first season, review aggregator Rotten Tomatoes reported an approval rating of 68% based on 31 critic reviews, with an average rating of 6.2/10. The website's critics consensus reads, "If Ginny & Georgia can't quite pull off its tonally ambitious first season, it's at least entertaining to watch it try." Metacritic gave the first season a weighted average score of 62 out of 100 based on 15 critic reviews, indicating "generally favorable reviews".

Kristen Baldwin of Entertainment Weekly gave the first season a B- and wrote a review saying, "Ginny & Georgia wants us to love the way that Georgia always manages to stay one step ahead... Instead, I kept hoping that Child Protective Services would finally catch up." Melanie McFarland of Salon said, "playing with class conflict in a show like this is easy. Leaning into other essential American ugliness while permeating the plot's intrigue with black humor and snark is a more challenging knit. This show blends all of these emotional colors nicely while also ensuring that neither Ginny nor Georgia or anyone else comes off as one-dimensional." Allison Shoemaker at RogerEbert.com complimented the show's depiction of a 15-year-old. "The writers and Gentry together do an especially nice job of capturing the endless conflicting impulses that make being 15 such a nightmare and thrill; Ginny often struggles to understand herself, but it's clear that Gentry knows her intimately." Lucy Mangan of The Guardian labeled it, "Desperate Housewives meets Gilmore Girls meets Buffy." Proma Khosla of Mashable calls out "the magnetism of Georgia and anyone she meets, Max's tenderness, [and] the rollercoaster of adolescent female friendship" as key components of the show. Reviewing the series' first season for Rolling Stone, Alan Sepinwall gave a rating of 3/5. When comparing the series to Gilmore Girls, he said: "There's also one area where Ginny & Georgia has a clear leg up on its predecessor: It understands from the jump that it's not especially healthy to have a mom who wants to be your best friend and is reluctant to fully grow up herself."

The second season has a 60% approval rating on Rotten Tomatoes, based on 10 reviews, with an average rating of 6.5/10. The website's critics consensus states, "Ginny & Georgia continues to strain credulity in its search for topical drama, but fans of the first season ought to still enjoy this sudsy sophomore outing." On Metacritic, the second season has a weighted average score of 71 out of 100 based on 5 reviews, indicating "generally favorable reviews".

Controversies
On February 25, 2021, the term "Oppression Olympics" went viral on Twitter in response to a scene where the characters Hunter and Ginny use the term in an argument. The scene was received negatively by viewers, who criticized its commentary on race and stereotypes, with many calling the exchange "embarrassing".

On March 1, 2021, the series fell into another controversy regarding a line from the final episode of Season 1, spoken by Ginny to Georgia: "You go through men faster than Taylor Swift." This drew backlash from fans, who condemned the line as being misogynistic and an example of slut-shaming the musician; the phrase "Respect Taylor Swift" trended worldwide on Twitter. Swift acknowledged the situation herself by tweeting, "Hey Ginny & Georgia, 2010 called and it wants its lazy, deeply sexist joke back. How about we stop degrading hard working women by defining this horse shit as FunnY." She also criticized Netflix—which distributed her documentary Miss Americana—writing, "After Miss Americana, this outfit doesn't look cute on you". The show was subsequently review bombed on multiple platforms, including Rotten Tomatoes, IMDb, and Metacritic; as well as Google reviews. The series was also criticized for its unflattering lines referring to Lady Gaga and Lana Del Rey.

Other media
On February 26, 2021, Netflix released Ginny & Georgia: The Afterparty.

References

External links
 
 
 

2020s American comedy-drama television series
2020s American high school television series
2020s American LGBT-related comedy television series
2020s American LGBT-related drama television series
2021 American television series debuts
Coming-of-age television shows
English-language Netflix original programming
Lesbian-related television shows
Television series about dysfunctional families
Television series about teenagers
Television shows filmed in Toronto
Television shows set in Massachusetts